The Calgary Broncos were an original World Hockey Association franchise, founded November 1, 1971. In the first WHA draft, the Broncos chose Barry Gibbs, Jim Harrison, Dale Hoganson and Jack Norris. The team relocated prior to the start of the first WHA season when team owner Bob Brownridge died.  They moved to Ohio, becoming the Cleveland Crusaders, having never played a game in Calgary.

The Broncos were established in anticipation of an Alberta rivalry with the Edmonton Oilers.  After the team moved, the Edmonton Oilers were renamed Alberta Oilers with the intention of splitting their home games between Calgary and Edmonton.  The Oilers ultimately did not play any home games in Calgary, and reverted to the name "Edmonton Oilers" after one season.

Calgary later joined the WHA in 1975 when the Vancouver Blazers relocated to become the Calgary Cowboys.

See also
 List of ice hockey teams in Alberta

References

Ice hockey teams in Alberta
Broncos, Calgary
World Hockey Association teams
Defunct ice hockey teams in Canada
Ice hockey clubs established in 1971
1971 establishments in Alberta